is a 1998 Japanese video game developed and published by Human Entertainment for the PlayStation. The game is one of the first open-world adventure games ever made and focuses on the search for a lost classmate in a small rural American town.

The game has never been localized outside of Japan but in 2021 an English-language fan translation project was completed and released to the public.

Plot
The game takes place in Mizzurna Falls, a fictional town in Colorado near the Rocky Mountains.  

On Christmas Day 1995, a young girl, Kathy Flannery is discovered unconscious in the forest, apparently attacked by a bear. Soon after, high school student Emma Rowland goes missing. Emma's classmate Matthew Williams becomes involved in the mystery surrounding the disappearance and the dark secrets of the town.

Gameplay

The player has seven days to explore the town and countryside talking to the residents in order to solve the mystery. One in game hour is around five minutes in real time. 

The strict seven-day time limit makes it difficult to see all the events and get the best of the three endings. The player can save the game by sleeping for either one or five in game hours. The game features the "tank style" movement controls made famous by Resident Evil, fighting and shooting systems, and quick time events. The game also features a full weather cycle and the residents of the town have individual daily routines.  

The player has access to a Volkswagen Beetle and a boat to move around town quickly. Matthew can eat at the local diners, and must keep his car fueled. Matthew can also use his mobile phone to call other characters and certain businesses in the town.

Development and release 
It is the only game by designer Taichi Ishizuka (The Firemen) as a writer and director, who followed this by moving to Canada as a nature guide. The game is reminiscent of Twin Peaks.

The game was released on December 23, 1998 in Japan for the Sony PlayStation, and was published by Human Entertainment themselves. The game was never localized nor published in the West.

Reception and legacy 
Upon release, four reviewers from Famitsu gave it a score of 22 out of 40.

Its legacy is in being one of the first open-world video games. Rolling Stone commented that the title was "quirky, weird, and rife with references to a cornucopia of media, namely Twin Peaks, and traces of it can now be seen in cult favorites like Deadly Premonition."

Localization attempts
For a while the game was "little more than a 20-year-old curiosity" according to Waypoint, which could only be played via poor emulation or by purchasing a Japanese version of the game. However, in 2017 Tokyo-based freelance translator Resident Evie translated the script into English as part of a playthrough project. She also set up the Tumblr Project Mizzurna, a hub for discussions and content around the game. Evie noted that "The game was so innovative that it was even slightly broken".

In mid-2019, an unofficial English localization patch based on Evie's translation was released in an incomplete state. However, the patch was quickly pulled off various sites due to a copyright complaint, as the publisher had compiled all the code from the authors without permission.

In late 2019, a game translator under the pseudonym "Mr.Nobody" published a Spanish translation patch based on the aforementioned English patch, making it possible to play the game in Spanish.

On March 30, 2021, professional game translator Cirosan and professional mobile game developer Nikita, using Resident Evie's translated script as a base, released the first full English patch for Mizzurna Falls. In order to make this project possible, Nikita built a special compression tool in order to fit most of the game's notably large script onto a single-disc format. Despite this new tool, Cirosan still had to edit and revise parts of the script, with Evie's permission, in order to fit the entire story into the translation. This release effectively ended the 22-year wait for an English localization.

Notes

References

External links 
 Project Mizzurna

1998 video games
Adventure games
Detective video games
Human Entertainment games
Japan-exclusive video games
Occult detective fiction
Open-world video games
PlayStation (console) games
PlayStation (console)-only games
Psychological horror games
Single-player video games
Video games developed in Japan
Video games set in 1998
Video games set in Colorado
Christmas video games